The Working formulation is an obsolete classification of non-Hodgkin lymphomas, first proposed in 1982. It has since been replaced by other lymphoma classifications, the latest published by the WHO in 2016  but is still used by cancer agencies for compilation of lymphoma statistics.

Low Grade
Malignant lymphoma, small lymphocytic (chronic lymphocytic leukemia)
Malignant lymphoma, follicular, predominantly small cleaved cell
Malignant lymphoma, follicular, mixed (small cleaved and large cell)

Intermediate grade  
Malignant lymphoma, follicular, predominantly large cell
Malignant lymphoma, diffuse, small cleaved cell
Malignant lymphoma, diffuse, mixed small and large cell
Malignant lymphoma, diffuse, large cell

High grade
Malignant lymphoma, large cell, immunoblastic
Malignant lymphoma, lymphoblastic
Malignant lymphoma, small noncleaved cells (Burkitt lymphoma)

Miscellaneous
Composite
Mycosis fungoides
Histiocytic
Extramedullary plasmacytoma
Unclassifiable

References 

Lymphoma